What Would Sal Do? is a Canadian television comedy series, which premiered on CraveTV in 2017 and was aired on Super Channel in 2018.

The series stars Dylan Taylor as Sal, an aimless and self-centred underachiever in Sudbury, Ontario, who discovers that he is actually the Second Coming of Jesus Christ, and must learn to become a better person in preparation for his destiny. The series also stars Jennifer Dale as his mother Maria, Ryan McDonald as his best friend Vince, Kaniehtiio Horn as his love interest Nicole, and Scott Thompson as Father Luke.

The cast also includes Robin Brûlé, Jason Blicker, K. Trevor Wilson, Jesse Camacho, Jim Calarco, Eric Peterson, Paula Brancati, Sean Cullen and Lisa Codrington in supporting roles.

According to series creator Andrew DeAngelis, the series is not meant to mock religion per se, but to simply explore the concept of an antihero striving to become a better person.

Plot
Sal Camilucci (Taylor) is a slacker and small-time criminal in Sudbury, Ontario, whose mother Maria (Dale) reveals to him that she was a virgin when she became pregnant with him and demands that he start performing good deeds in preparation for his destiny as the Second Coming of Christ. He is initially disbelieving and unwilling, and instead tries to stay on his current life path with the aid of his friend Vince (McDonald) — but he seems to have a knack for stumbling into opportunities to perform small-scale miracles in the process, such as when he gets into a jail fight in the first episode and his punch to a blind man's face restores his sight.

Sal is also trying to win the love of Nicole (Horn), a masseuse at his favourite rub and tug parlour, but she doesn't see a stable future with him and instead starts to date his childhood nemesis Darryl (Scott Cavalheiro), who is now a wealthy and confident lawyer who has offered to pay for Nicole to go back to school to pursue her dream of becoming an artist.

At the time of Sal's conception, Maria was in a relationship with Joe (Blicker); as they had never had sex, Joe believed that Maria had cheated on him, and started having an affair of his own with her sister Lena (Brûlé), who is now his wife. Maria has never gotten over her feelings for Joe, which has caused friction in her relationship with her sister as Lena believes that Maria is still trying to steal Joe back, while remaining oblivious to the hypocrisy of having stolen Joe from Maria in the first place.

Father Luke (Thompson), the only other person who knew about the circumstances of Sal's birth prior to Maria revealing them to Sal, continually tries to step in unsolicited as Sal's spiritual advisor, while simultaneously trying to manage his declining congregation and angling to get appointed as a bishop.

Production and airing
The series began production in Sudbury in August 2015. It was originally slated to air on Super Channel in 2016, but was dropped by the network after parent company Allarcom filed for bankruptcy protection, and was then acquired by Bell Media. In January 2017, CraveTV announced that the show would be added to its streaming lineup, premiering on March 24.

In early promotion, Taylor noted that he tried to play Sal as a fundamentally good person who had become a "douchebag" due to his upbringing. Dale highlighted Maria as "a completely unique and original role like nobody has ever seen before", while Thompson praised Father Luke as one of the first times he had ever been cast in a role that represented a departure from his established public image as a pioneering openly gay comedian, and allowed him to just play a character without the "baggage" of his work in The Kids in the Hall.

Early coverage of the Crave acquisition indicated that the show would also air on HBO Canada at a later date, although this did not occur; instead, the show was then reacquired by Super Channel following its discharge from creditor protection. Super Channel aired it in 2018 and took over streaming rights, with the show moving from Crave back to Super Channel's premium streaming channel on Amazon Prime.

The series was not renewed for a second season.

Critical reception
John Doyle of The Globe and Mail praised the show, comparing it favourably to Trailer Park Boys, My Name Is Earl and Letterkenny.

Awards
The show garnered three Canadian Screen Award nominations at the 5th Canadian Screen Awards in 2017, for Best Actress in a Comedy Series (Dale), Best Supporting Actor in a Comedy Series (McDonald) and Best Writing in a Comedy Series (DeAngelis for "Punches Pilot".)

Episode list

References

External links

2017 Canadian television series debuts
2010s Canadian sitcoms
Television shows set in Greater Sudbury
Television shows filmed in Greater Sudbury
2017 Canadian television series endings
Canadian comedy web series
Super Channel (Canadian TV channel) original programming
Canadian religious television series
Religious comedy television series